Grace Atkinson (born November 9, 1938), better known as Ti-Grace Atkinson, is an American radical feminist activist, writer and philosopher.

Life and career
Atkinson was born into a prominent Louisiana family.

Atkinson earned her Bachelor of Fine Arts (BFA) from the Pennsylvania Academy of the Fine Arts in 1964. While still in Philadelphia, she helped found the Institute of Contemporary Art, acting as its first director, and was sculpture critic for the periodical ARTnews. She later moved to New York City where, in 1967, she entered the PhD program in philosophy at Columbia University, where she studied with the philosopher and art critic Arthur Danto.

Atkinson later moved on to study the work of Gottlob Frege with philosopher Charles Parsons. She taught at several colleges and universities over the years, including the Pratt Institute, Case Western Reserve University and Tufts University.

As an undergraduate, Atkinson read Simone de Beauvoir's The Second Sex, and struck up a correspondence with Beauvoir, who suggested that she contact Betty Friedan.  Atkinson became an early member of the National Organization for Women, which Friedan had co-founded, serving on the national board, and becoming the New York chapter president in 1967. Her time with the organization was tumultuous, including a row with the national leadership over her attempts to defend and promote Valerie Solanas and her SCUM Manifesto in the wake of the Andy Warhol shooting.

In 1968, she left the organization because it would not confront issues like abortion and marriage inequalities. She founded the October 17th Movement, which later became The Feminists, a radical feminist group active until 1973; however, she left the group in 1971. By then, she had written several pamphlets on feminism, was a member of the Daughters of Bilitis and was advocating specifically political lesbianism. Her book Amazon Odyssey was published in 1974.

In 1971, Patricia Buckley Bozell, a Catholic and conservative activist, slapped or attempted to slap (unclear if physical contact was actually made) Atkinson after the latter made what Mrs. Bozell described as "an illiterate harangue against the mystical body of Christ". The incident occurred on the platform of Catholic University of America's auditorium while Atkinson was discussing the virginity of the Virgin Mary.

"Sisterhood", Atkinson famously said,  "is powerful. It kills. Mostly sisters."
In 2013, Atkinson, along with Carol Hanisch, Kathy Scarbrough, and Kathie Sarachild, initiated "Forbidden Discourse: The Silencing of Feminist Criticism of 'Gender'", which they described as an "open statement from 48 radical feminists from seven countries". In August 2014, Michelle Goldberg in The New Yorker described it as expressing their "alarm" at "threats and attacks, some of them physical, on individuals and organizations daring to challenge the currently fashionable concept of gender."

Bibliography

Books
 Amazon Odyssey (1974)

Pamphlets and book chapters
 "The Institution of Sexual Intercourse" (pamphlet, 1968, published by The Feminists)
 "Vaginal orgasm as a mass hysterical survival response" (pamphlet, 1968, published by The Feminists)
 "Radical Feminism" (pamphlet, 1969, published by The Feminists)
 "Radical Feminism and Love" (pamphlet, 1969, published by The Feminists)

References

External links
 Ti-Grace Atkinson speaks to the Feminist Art program at the California State University at Fresno. Retrieved April 23, 2007
 
 Papers of Ti-Grace Atkinson, 1938-2013. Schlesinger Library, Radcliffe Institute, Harvard University.

1938 births
20th-century American women writers
20th-century American LGBT people
21st-century American women writers
21st-century American LGBT people
American feminist writers
American lesbian writers
American women's rights activists
Cajun people
Columbia Graduate School of Arts and Sciences alumni
Daughters of Bilitis members
The Feminists members
Lesbian feminists
LGBT people from Louisiana
Living people
Pennsylvania Academy of the Fine Arts alumni
Political lesbians
Radical feminists
Writers from Baton Rouge, Louisiana